"Bermuda Triangle" is a song by Barry Manilow, from his album Barry. Released as a single in 1981, it reached number 15 in the UK Singles Chart, number 16 in Germany and number 23 in Ireland.

The song features tonicizations, the cycle of fifths and a brief modulation to the tonic minor, which represents Manilow 'losing his woman'.

Chart history

References

1981 singles
Barry Manilow songs
Song recordings produced by Ron Dante
Songs written by Barry Manilow
Arista Records singles
1981 songs
Songs with lyrics by Jack Feldman (songwriter)